Samkelo Mike Radebe (born 8 May 1989 in Soweto, South Africa) is a South African Paralympic sprint runner and high jumper who competes in the T45 class. He lost both arms in an electrocution accident at age 9 when his kite got caught in electrical wires. The South African organisation Children of Fire assisted with Radebe's rehabilitation after he was injured. He began running in high school in 2003, and studies law at the University of Johannesburg.

Radebe failed to qualify for the 2008 Beijing Games and experienced lower performance levels until 2010 due to shin splints. In 2010 he won the silver medal in the T46 100m race at the Commonwealth Games in Delhi, India, and in 2011 gold as part of the 4 × 100 m relay team in the 2011 IPC World Championships. In the 2012 Paralympic Games, Radebe won a gold medal as part of the South African 4 × 100 m relay team in a world record time of 41.78 seconds.

Radebe has been chosen as Sportsman with a Disability of the Year at both the Ekurhuleni Sports Awards and the Gauteng Sports Awards.

References

1989 births
Living people
Paralympic athletes of South Africa
Medalists at the 2012 Summer Paralympics
Paralympic gold medalists for South Africa
Sportspeople from Soweto
South African amputees
Zulu people
Athletes (track and field) at the 2012 Summer Paralympics
Commonwealth Games medallists in athletics
Commonwealth Games silver medallists for South Africa
Athletes (track and field) at the 2010 Commonwealth Games
Paralympic medalists in athletics (track and field)
South African male sprinters
Medallists at the 2010 Commonwealth Games